Fyodorovka is a rural locality (a selo) and the administrative center of Fyodorovsky Selsoviet of Yenotayevsky District, Astrakhan Oblast, Russia. The population was 862 as of 2010. There are 13 streets.

Geography 
Fyodorovka is located 12 km northwest of Yenotayevka (the district's administrative centre) by road. Ivanovka is the nearest rural locality.

References 

Rural localities in Yenotayevsky District